Tree trunk is the stem and main wooden axis of a tree.

Tree trunk, or variants, may refer to:

"Treetrunk" (song), by The Doors, 1972
Tree Trunks, a fictional character in the American animated TV series Adventure Time
"Tree Trunks" (Adventure Time), an episode of the series

See also

 Trunk (disambiguation)
 Cyanea copelandii, a flowering plant known as treetrunk cyanea
 Tree trunk spider